Migrant is the fifth studio album by The Dear Hunter. It was  released on April 2, 2013 via Equal Vision Records and Cave & Canary Goods. The album was produced by Mike Watts and Casey Crescenzo, and mixed by Mike Watts. It is the band's first non-concept album.

Track listing

References

External links 
 The Dear Hunter Official Website

2013 albums
The Dear Hunter albums
Equal Vision Records albums